The International Federation of League of Nations Societies (IFLNS) (French: Union internationale des associations pour la Société des Nations  - UIASDN) gathered national associations promoting the ideals of the League of Nations. At its height, it claimed member-Associations in forty countries. It was founded in Geneva, Switzerland in 1919, and ceased operations in 1939.

It is considered to be the forerunner of the World Federation of United Nations Associations, founded in 1946.

References

League of Nations
Defunct organisations based in Switzerland
World Federation of United Nations Associations
Organisations based in Geneva
Organizations established in 1919
Organizations disestablished in 1939